Kingborough Lions United Football Club is a semi-professional association football club based in Kingston, Tasmania. Founded in 1998, the club currently competes many leagues including in the NPL Tasmania and the Women's Super League. The club has a large playing group ranging and teams range from juniors, youth academy, and social teams through to high performance men and women's programs.

History
Kingborough Lions has a complicated history having been formed out of several mergers of former clubs in the Hobart region. The club in its current form was formed after a merger between Kingborough United and West Hobart Lions in 1998.

Kingborough United were a long standing southern-based Premier League team and was the result of the previous mergers of Kingston Cannons and Rapid Hobart. The club's original home ground was the Sherburd Park Complex, which it shared with the Blackmans Bay District Cricket Club. In 1996, the club moved to the then Tasmanian Baseball Complex (Now known as the Lightwood Park Complex), taking up a long term tenancy and they shared the facilities with the Kingston Crows Cricket Club.

Caledonian Soccer Club (West Hobart Lions) was already a unified side formed out of a smaller West Hobart club, and the previously largely successful side of "Caledonians" who were a powerhouse club in the 1950s, but had since faded.
The side was relatively nomadic in existence with no permanent facilities, but training was generally undertaken at the West Hobart Oval. Caledonian Soccer Club was forced to change their name in 1994 after an edict from the newly formed Soccer Australia mandated clubs could not use ethnic connotations in club names.

In 2010 the club began operating under the updated name of Kingborough Lions United Football Club, and in 2012 a new logo was designed and presented on all playing strips.

As a result, Kingborough Lions are the inheritors of the traditions of these four clubs, and have now become a large club based in the municipality of Kingborough. Although relatively unsuccessful in their senior programs since merging, the club has the foundations in place to be a successful club due to the large player catchment area, and is the only club in the Southern region of Hobart with a high performance Men and Women's program.

Players

Current Squad - Men 
Note: Known players.

Coaching Staff - Men 
Note: Known Staff.

Recent Seasons - Men

Ref:

Recent Seasons - Women

Honours
State Championships: 7 times (as "Caledonians", 1953,1955,1956,1957,1958,1960,1981); 5 times (as "Rapid", 1964,1976,1979,1980,1982) 
State Championship Runners-up: 1 time (as "Rapid" 1961) 
Southern Premierships: 6 times (as "Caledonians", 1953,1955,1956,1957,1958,1960); 4 times (as "Rapid",1961,1964,1976,1982); 1 time (as "Lions" 1999)

External links
 Kingborough Lions United FC – Official Site

References

National Premier Leagues clubs
Soccer clubs in Tasmania
Association football clubs established in 1998
1998 establishments in Australia